The USATF U20 Outdoor Championships, formerly known as the USA Junior Outdoor Track & Field Championships, is an annual outdoor track and field competition organized by USA Track & Field (USATF) which serves as the national championship for American athletes aged under 20. The competition is also used for American national team selection for the IAAF World U20 Championships in even-numbered years and the Pan American U20 Athletics Championships in odd-numbered years.

The event was established in 1972 and were originally organized by the Amateur Athletic Union. The Athletics Congress of the USA took over organizational duties in 1980 and the competition was held under the USATF name for the first time in 1993. The men's and women's competitions were held separately from 1972 to 1982, with combined sex championships being held in 1974, and 1978–1980 within that period.

It is held separately from the USATF National Junior Olympic Track & Field Championships, which hosts various age category competitions for athletes aged between 8 and 18.

Events
On the current programme a total of 38 individual United States U20 Championship athletics events are contested, divided evenly between men and women. For each of the sexes, there are six track running events, three obstacle events, four jumps, four throws, a racewalk and a combined track and field event.

Track running
100 meters, 200 meters, 400 meters, 800 meters, 1500 meters, 3000 meters (women only), 5000 meters, 10,000 meters (men only)
Obstacle events
100 meters hurdles (women only), 110 meters hurdles (men only), 400 meters hurdles, 3000 meters steeplechase
Jumping events
Pole vault, high jump, long jump, triple jump
Throwing events
Shot put, discus throw, javelin throw, hammer throw
Walking events
10,000 meters race walk
Combined events
Decathlon (men only), heptathlon (women only)

For the years 1972 and 1973, track races were held over imperial distances before metrication of the sport in 1974. The results of field events were measured in metric units from 2001 onwards. The distance events were mile run, 3 miles and 6 miles. The women's pentathlon was replaced by the heptathlon in 1981. The decathlon was not held at the first edition and the pentathlon not held at the second edition. The women's 400 m hurdles was not contested in 1972 or 1974. The steeplechase was held over 2000 m for men in 1986 and for women in 2002.

The women's distance programme varied in early years, with no distance race over one mile in 1972, a two-mile race in 1973, no race again in 1974, then the introduction of a 3000 m in 1975. A women's 10,000 m was held from 1988 to 1998, but the women's 5000 m in (introduced in 1996) became the women's longest distance thereafter. A women's steeplechase was first held in 2002. Women's racewalking event has varied in distance over the years, starting over one mile in 1972, skipping the 1973 and 1974 editions, being held over 1500 m in 1975, over 3000 m from 1976 to 1985, 5000 m from 1986 to 1999, before finally matching the men's 10,000 m distance in from 2000 onwards. The women's field programme gradually expanded to match the men's, with triple jump being introduced in 1985 and pole vault and hammer throw in 1995.

Editions

Records

Men

Women

References

 
United States athletics (track and field) championships
Under-20 athletics competitions
Track and field competitions in the United States
Track and field
Recurring sporting events established in 1972
1972 establishments in the United States